OSF Saint Francis Medical Center, located in Peoria, Illinois, United States, is a teaching hospital for the University of Illinois College of Medicine at Peoria and part of the OSF Healthcare System. The center, which is the largest hospital in the Peoria metropolitan area and in central Illinois, is designated by the state of Illinois as the Level I adult and pediatric regional trauma center for a 26-county region in mid-Illinois.

OSF Saint Francis owns the Children's Hospital of Illinois (though the hospital has its own President), the OSF Saint Francis Heart Hospital, the Illinois Neurological Institute, and the OSF Saint Francis Medical Center College of Nursing, which are all located either in or near the Medical Center. The hospital is a clinical training hospital for many medical students, interns, residents, and fellows of the Peoria campus of the University of Illinois College of Medicine.

It is the largest Level I trauma center for adults and children between the Chicago, Rockford and St. Louis metropolitan area. It is the fourth largest hospital in all of Illinois.

History
The first hospital unit of what later became the center was established in 1876 by a group of Franciscan Sisters who had been sent to Peoria, Illinois from a German expatriate group settled in Iowa City, Iowa.  In 1877, the Sisters who had migrated to Peoria were granted permission to form an independent religious community and became "The Sisters of the Third Order of St. Francis, Peoria, Illinois".

In 2009 and 2010, the Medical Center built a new emergency room. A new Children's Hospital of Illinois was built, with a new Level I pediatric and a Level III neonatal intensive care unit (the only one in Central Illinois) and emergency room. The Milestone Project was the largest expansion in the hospital's history. The hospital is now home to nearly all pediatric and adult services.

About 
The hospital offers adult and pediatric renal transplantation and adult pancreatic transplantation; most of the time, adult, and especially, pediatric, cardiac transplantation cases are referred to tertiary care academic medical transplantation centers in Chicago or St. Louis, though there are facilities and surgeons and physicians available for cardiac transplantation at the center's Heart Institute and at the Children's Hospital, and they have been performed there repeatedly. The hospital offers advanced burn care, hyperbaric, and debridement and grafting services for both children and adults, and sometimes, if need be, can transfer very severe cases to the certified state burn units in Springfield, Chicago or St. Louis.

The center's new Jump Trading Simulation & Education Center is used for bioengineering, biochemical research, research on new devices and tissues and grafts, and medical and nursing and bioengineering training.

Organization
The Sisters of the Third Order of St. Francis (led by Sister Judith Ann Duvall, O.S.F.) is established as a non-profit organization and is the parent company of OSF Healthcare, which in turn is the operator of the OSF Healthcare System. The religious order of nuns and the hospital is not considered a part of the Roman Catholic Diocese of Peoria, but still works closely with it.  The System consists of 13 facilities in Illinois, including the center, plus one in Escanaba, Michigan.

Awards
In 2000, the center was listed among the "Most Wired Hospitals and Health Systems" by Hospitals & Health Networks, an indicator of the degree to which information technology was used in the center.

The center received a Lantern Award in 2013 for nursing care in the emergency department. The center is also the #1 hospital in the state of Illinois for organ recovery. In 2017, it was ranked fifth by U.S. News & World Report in three-way tie for the state's top hospitals.

Children's Hospital of Illinois 

Children's Hospital of Illinois (CHOI) is a nationally ranked pediatric acute care hospital located within OSF Saint Francis Medical Center in Peoria, Illinois. The hospital has 144 beds. It is affiliated with The University of Illinois College of Medicine, and is a member of OSF Health. The hospital provides comprehensive pediatric specialties and subspecialties to infants, children, teens, and young adults aged 0–21 throughout Central Illinois. CHOI also sometimes treats adults that require pediatric care. Children's Hospital of Illinois features the only pediatric Level 1 Trauma Center in the region, and 1 of 4 in the state.

References

Further reading

  Note: AccessMyLibrary requires registration to view full content; URL provided gives first paragraph of article.
  Note: HighBeam Research requires subscription to view full content; URL provided gives first paragraph of article.

External links
 OSF Saint Francis Medical Center — official site
 
 OSF Saint Francis video

Companies based in Peoria, Illinois
Buildings and structures in Peoria, Illinois
OSF HealthCare
Teaching hospitals in Illinois
Medical schools in Illinois
1876 establishments in Illinois
Hospitals in Illinois